McLear is a surname. Notable people with the surname include:

George McLear (1891–1950), Australian rules footballer
Jim McLear (1896–1968), Australian rules footballer
Lewis McLear (born 1996), Scottish footballer
Theodore McLear (1879–1958), American sport wrestler

See also
McLeary